Gustavo Gren Córdoba (10 May 1880 - 9 November 1965), better known as Gustavo Green, as he was often mentioned in the press of his time (Gustavo H. Green y Córdoba ), was a Spanish footballer who played as a forward for FC Barcelona and RCD Espanyol.

After spending his childhood in a south London neighborhood, he settled in Barcelona and began playing friendlies with Escocès FC, Catalá FC, and Team Roig. He was captain of the side that won the very first official title in Spanish football, the 1900–01 Copa Macaya with Hispania AC. He won all three editions of the Copa Macaya with three different clubs (Hispania AC, Barça and Español), being the only one to do so. He was thus the first great star of Catalan football as well as one of the first great forwards of Barcelona and RCD Espanyol (then Club Español), netting over 100 for them between 1911 and 1910, although this tally includes goals scored in friendlies and unofficial games.

Early life
Gustavo Gren was born in Málaga to a German father and a Spanish mother, but it was in Catalonia where he found his home. He spent his childhood in a neighborhood in the south of London, where he was first introduced to football. Together with his brother, Guillermo, they competed in some cycling tests in London using the alias “Green”, which was an anglicization of their German surname.

Playing career

Escocés FC
At the age of 20, Green returned to Spain and settled in Catalonia at the end of the 19th century, where he first joined Escocès FC, a team made up of Scottish workers from a factory in Sant Andreu, such as George Girvan, Joseph Black and John Hamilton, the latter being the team's captain and goalkeeper.

Català FC
Around March 1900, within only a month of his arrival, Escocés was immersed in a three-way controversy with FC Barcelona and Català FC, due to Green and Black (among others) playing a few friendly matches with both Escocès and Catalá in a very short space of time, causing Barcelona to launch complaints in their direction as they were unhappy about Escocès stars turning out for their city rivals at the time. The local press, who were falling in the love with the game that had grabbed the city's residents, began mocking these Scottish players by calling them 'taxi-footballers'. While Black stayed with Escocés, Green decided to leave them as he probably felt like an outsider (he is the team's only documented non-Scottish member), and joined Català FC around April, but a conflict between the club members caused some of them to leave and found a new club, Team Roig, which went on to become Hispania Athletic Club on October 1900, with Green becoming the first captain of this team. Shortly after, in November, Hispania took advantage of the dissolution of Escocés FC to incorporate several of its most prominent players, and Green might have played a pivotal role in Hispania's successful recruitment of Hamilton, Black and Willie Gold.

Hispania AC
After the founding of the club, Hispania AC organized the first edition of the Copa Macaya in 1901, which was the first football championship played on the Iberian Peninsula, and the forerunner for the Catalan championship which began in 1903. In the opening match of the tournament against FC Barcelona on 20 January 1900, Green scored twice in a 2–1 comeback win, thus contributing decisively to help Hispania become the first-ever team to win a competitive match in Spanish football as well as the first team to defeat Barça in a competitive match. This result proved to be decisive in the outcome of the tournament since Hispania won the title over Barça by just two points. Green was Hispania's captain and best player at the tournament, playing a pivotal role in helping his side become the very first Spanish club to win an official title. He finished the tournament with 9 goals, 7 of which came in 0–10 and 14–0 trashings of Franco-Española. Those nine goals saw him finish as the second highest top scorer of the tournament only behind Joan Gamper who netted a whopping 31 goals.

FC Barcelona
Despite his goalscorer prowess, differences with the managers of the club about the position in which he should line up led to his departure and subsequent entry into FC Barcelona, where together with Joan Gamper, Arthur Witty and Udo Steinberg, he helped Barça win the 1901–02 Copa Macaya, the club's first-ever piece of silverware.

Club Español
The following season, he was recruited by Club Español where he spent most of his career. In his first season at the club, Green was decisive for Espanyol to win the third and last Copa Macaya, the club's first-ever piece of silverware, being the top scorer of the tournament with 7 goals including a brace in the decisive match against Hispania (3–1) on 12 April 1903. He thus won all the editions of this Cup each time with a different team.

From 1903–04 onwards, the Catalan championship began to be organized by the Catalan Football Federation and the Copa Macaya became known as the Campionat de Catalunya, and together with Emilio Sampere, Ángel Rodríguez and Ángel Ponz, Green won its first edition with Español, thus winning the Catalan championship for the fourth time in a row. He remained loyal to the club until 1905, when Español had to suspend its activities due to a lack of players since most of them were university students who enrolled to study at universities outside Catalonia in the 1905–06 academic year. Most of the remaining players, such as goalkeeper Pedro Gibert, joined X Sporting Club, but Green apparently remained with no club until 1908, when Español reemerged from the merger of X and the Spanish Jiu-Jitsu Club.

He played with Espanyol for four more years, being a member of the great Espanyol side of the 1910s that had the likes of Paco Bru, Emilio Sampere and the Armet brothers (Francisco and Kinké), winning the Campionat de Catalunya for the second time in 1911–12.

Football executive
Even after retiring, he remained closely linked to Espanyol, since he carried out functions as an accountant in its board of directors chaired by Santiago de la Riva. In addition to being a player, he was then a member, treasurer, and accountant on the board of directors of Español (1909–1913), he can also be considered as one of the first coaches of Espanyol, because in 1904 he was in charge of directing the training sessions together with teammate Ángel Ponz.

Personal life
At that time living exclusively out of football wasn't common, and therefore he had a second job, with his profession being that of a telegraph operator, in fact, when competing in cycling, he would also use the alias "Télégraphe". He married María Anglada Ribas in 1907 in Barcelona.

Greed died on 9 November 1965 in Bilbao at the age of 65.

Honours

Club
Hispania AC
 Champions: 1900–01

FC Barcelona
 Copa Macaya: 
 Champions: 1901–02

-

Club Español
 Copa Macaya: 
 Champions: 1902–03

 Catalan championship
 Champions: 1903–04 and 1911–12

References

1880 births
1965 deaths
Spanish people of German descent
Footballers from Málaga
Spanish footballers
Association football forwards
FC Barcelona players
RCD Espanyol footballers